Néstor Iván Osuna Patiño (born April 12, 1963) is a Colombian lawyer, magistrate and university professor. Since August 17, 2022, he is the current Minister of Justice

He has served as a magistrate of the Superior Council of the Judiciary and associate judge of the Constitutional Court.

Minister of Justice
On August 7, 2022, he was appointed by President Gustavo Petro as Minister of Justice and Law of Colombia; being the fourth minister in the history of Colombia to declare himself openly Homosexual. Days later, it was announced that he still could not be sworn in, since he had requested a little more time to finish his work at the Externado University. On the 17th of the same month, he was installed as minister.

References 

|-

1962 births
Living people
Politicians from Bogotá
Cabinet of Gustavo Petro
Ministers of Justice and Law of Colombia
Colombian Liberal Party politicians
Universidad Externado de Colombia alumni
University of Salamanca alumni
21st-century Colombian politicians
21st-century Colombian judges
Colombian LGBT politicians